Claudia Weber (born 6 November 1967) is a German former judoka. She competed in the women's heavyweight event at the 1992 Summer Olympics.

References

External links
 

1967 births
Living people
German female judoka
Olympic judoka of Germany
Judoka at the 1992 Summer Olympics
People from Frechen
Sportspeople from Cologne (region)
20th-century German women
21st-century German women